Groenendijk is a Dutch toponymic surname meaning "green dike". There are a number of hamlets, neighborhoods and dikes in the Low Countries from which the name may have originated. People with the name include:

Alfons Groenendijk (born 1964), Dutch football midfielder and manager
Jan Groenendijk (footballer) (1946–2014), Dutch football forward
Jan Groenendijk (draughts) (born 1998), Dutch draughts player
Jeroen Groenendijk (born 1949), Dutch logician, linguist and philosopher

References

Dutch-language surnames
Dutch toponymic surnames